The 2016–17 season was Pyunik's 23rd season in the Armenian Premier League.

Season events

Squad

Transfers

In

Loans in

Out

Released

Friendlies

Competitions

Overall record

Premier League

Results

Table

Armenian Cup

Final

UEFA Europa League

Qualifying rounds

Statistics

Appearances and goals

|-
|colspan="14"|Players who left Pyunik during the season:

|}

Goal scorers

Clean sheets

Disciplinary Record

Notes

References

FC Pyunik seasons
Pyunik
Pyunik